Darren Choi Kyoung-rok (Hangul: 최경록; born 15 March 1995) is a South Korean professional footballer who plays as an attacking midfielder for Karlsruher SC.

Club career
Previously having played football for the Ajou University team, Choi moved to Germany and joined FC St. Pauli in 2014. While still playing for the club's under-19 team, in January 2014, he extended his expiring contract until 2015 including a one-year extension option. From this moment on, he also participated in the first team's training.

Choi made his 2. Bundesliga debut for St. Pauli's first team on 6 April 2015 in a match against Fortuna Düsseldorf, scoring a brace within the first 16 minutes of the game.

In May 2018, Karlsruher SC, newly relegated to the 3. Liga, announced Choi would join for the 2018–19 season having agreed a three-year contract until 2021.

Career statistics

Club

References

External links
 Choi Kyoung-rok – National Team Stats at KFA 
 

1995 births
Living people
Association football forwards
South Korean footballers
FC St. Pauli players
Karlsruher SC players
2. Bundesliga players
3. Liga players
Ajou University alumni
South Korean expatriate footballers
South Korean expatriate sportspeople in Germany
Expatriate footballers in Germany
Footballers from Seoul